Táomiào (陶庙) may refer to the following locations in China:

 Taomiao, Anhui, town in Jieshou
 Taomiao, Shandong, town in Juye County